Catherine of Bulgaria (died after 1059) was empress consort to Byzantine emperor Isaac I Komnenos and co-regent of Constantine X for a period after the abdication of her spouse in 1059. She was a daughter of Ivan Vladislav of Bulgaria and his wife Maria, and thus a sister of Presian and Alusian. Catherine was also a paternal aunt of Maria of Bulgaria.

Life 
Catherine was a daughter of Ivan Vladislav (reigned 1015–18), the last Tsar of Bulgaria. She married the general Isaac Komnenos. After he became emperor in 1057, Isaac raised her to Augusta.

Isaac abdicated the throne on November 22, 1059. He retired to the Stoudios Monastery and spent the remainder of his life, until his death in late 1060 or 1061, as a monk. Following her husband's abdication, she appears to have co-reigned for a while with Constantine X, but eventually she too retired to the Myrelaion monastery under the monastic name of Xene.

Family 
Catherine had at least two children with Isaac:
 Manuel Komnenos (ca. 1030 – 1042/57), probably the "son of Komnenos" recorded as having been engaged to the daughter of the protospatharios Helios. He died sometime between 1042 and 1057. 
 Maria Komnene (born ca. 1034), her beauty is remarked upon by Psellos, but she remained unmarried, and retired with her mother to the Myrelaion.

References

Bibliography

External links 
Book 7 of the Chronographia which deals with the period 1056-1078. The text is part of the Internet Medieval Source Book.

11th-century births
11th-century deaths
11th-century Bulgarian women
11th-century Byzantine nuns
Aaronios family
Augustae
Bulgarian princesses
11th-century Byzantine empresses
Komnenos dynasty
Daughters of emperors